"All but dissertation" (ABD) is a term identifying a stage in the process of obtaining a research doctorate, most commonly used in the United States. 

In typical usage of the term, the ABD graduate student has completed the required preparatory coursework, passed the required preliminary, comprehensive, and doctoral qualifying examinations (or PhD candidacy examination). After the graduate student has successfully passed this examination stage, they are referred to as a PhD candidate. The informal ABD designation indicates that graduate student has met all program requirements except for writing of the dissertation (or thesis) and the final defense at the end of a PhD program. Therefore, any formal usage of term “PhD ABD degree" is erroneous. Some universities, including Columbia, Yale, and George Washington, may award a formal Master of Philosophy (MPhil) degree for these achievements.

Criticism 
The use of ABD or the similar PhD(c) for PhD candidate (also PhD-c or PhDc) as a credential has been criticized as misleading as these terms are not widely understood outside of academia or outside of the US. The term ABD has no equivalent meaning in PhD programs outside of the US that don't require a formal candidacy examination (e.g., Australia and New Zealand). According to the Queensland University of Technology (QUT) Higher Degree by Research Course Regulations, graduate students simply enrolled in a PhD program, are referred to as "PhD candidates" prior to completing any mandatory PhD coursework or examinations. Even in the US, candidacy and ABD are not always synonymous. For example, in the Stanford PhD program in computer science, a student may declare candidacy after settling on a permanent advisor and completing a number of breadth area requirements, but must pass a further qualifying exam, testing knowledge in greater depth, before being considered ABD.

References

Doctoral degrees